Qizjeh may refer to:
 Qizjeh, East Azerbaijan
 Qizjeh, Zanjan